Raymond Lovelock (19 June 1950 – 10 November 2017) was an Italian actor and musician, best known for his roles in genre films.

Early life
Lovelock was born in Rome on 19 June 1950. His mother was Italian and his father was English. They met during the Allied occupation of Italy in World War II. While at college, he supplemented his income as an extra in movies and TV commercials. He also performed in a rock band with longtime friend and actor Tomas Milian, where he was discovered by a talent agent.

Career

Acting career
Lovelock played his first credited movie part in the Spaghetti Western Se sei vivo spara (1967), directed by Giulio Questi and starring Milian. His breakthrough role came the following year in the crime thriller Bandits in Milan, as bank robber Donato 'Tuccio' Lopez. The film was a hit with critics and won several awards. He then established himself as both a reliable character actor and a leading man in Italian films and television, working steadily from the late 1960s.  

Among his more notable film roles are Fiddler on the Roof (where he played Fyedka, a Russian Christian farmer who marries a Jewish girl named Chava, against the wishes of Chava's father; 1971), Let Sleeping Corpses Lie (1974), Almost Human (1974), Violent Rome (1975), Live Like a Cop, Die Like a Man (1976), The Cassandra Crossing (1976), and The Last House on the Beach (1978). Later in his career he worked mostly in television, including a guest role on Mia And Me (2014).

Music career
In Italy, he released 10 singles, which included the main theme song of Live Like a Cop, Die Like a Man. He also released two singles in Japan, one of which "Koi Wa Kaze" reached #34 on the Japanese Oricon chart in 1970. His album, "All about Raymond Lovelock" also charted that year and peaked at #19.

Personal life 
An avid football fan, Lovelock was a member of ItalianAttori, a celebrity team that held charity matches.

Death 
He died in Trevi on 10 November 2017, at the age of 67 of cancer.

Filmography

Film

Television

References

External links

1950 births
2017 deaths
Male Spaghetti Western actors
Italian people of English descent
Male actors from Rome
People of Lazian descent

Italian male film actors
Italian male television actors
Italian male singers